Myles Elliot Zach Hippolyte (born 9 November 1994) is a professional footballer who plays as a winger for  club Stockport County.

A product of the Brentford Academy, Hippolyte moved to Scotland in 2014 and played for Livingston, Falkirk and St Mirren, before joining for Dunfermline Athletic in 2018. He returned to England a year later to play for Yeovil Town, before moving into the English Football League with Scunthorpe United. Born in England, Hippolyte declared his international allegiance to Grenada in 2023.

Career

Brentford
A forward, Hippolyte began his career as a schoolboy at Harrow Youth League club Westway in London. He also had brief spells at Fulham, Queens Park Rangers and Reading. He joined the youth system at League One club Brentford in 2010 and signed a scholarship deal on 27 June 2011. In his first season as a scholar, Hippolyte was part of the youth team which advanced to the fourth round of the 2011–12 FA Youth Cup. Hippolyte scored prolifically for the youth team and topped the team's goalscoring charts in both his seasons as a scholar.

Hippolyte joined Spartan South Midlands League First Division club Southall on a work experience loan deal on 11 January 2013. He scored on his debut versus London Lions the following day, with a late equaliser in a 2–2 draw. His second and final goal for the club came in a 2–0 win over Kings Langley on 5 March, for which he won the man of the match award. Hippolyte returned to Brentford when his loan expired, having scored two goals in four appearances. He was released at the end of the 2012–13 season, after failing to be offered a professional contract. Looking back in October 2014, Hippolyte said "off the pitch I was slack. I was late to training and wasn't switched on enough. It was the worst possible outcome because if it was due to lack of ability I could've accepted it".

Return to Southall
After unsuccessful trials at Cambridge United, Blackburn Rovers, Oxford United, Charlton Athletic and York City, Hippolyte returned to Southall in November 2013. He made one appearance in a 0–0 league draw with Arlesey Town Reserves on 16 November. He later returned and made a further appearance towards the end of the 2013–14 season, in a 0–0 draw with Risborough Rangers on 1 May 2014.

Tamworth
Hippolyte joined Conference Premier club Tamworth on trial in November 2013. He signed non-contract terms and made his debut for the club with a start in a 1–0 Birmingham Senior Cup first round win over Coleshill Town on 19 November. After further training with the club, Hippolyte was called into the squad for an FA Trophy match versus Boston United on 14 December, but remained an unused substitute. He departed after the club declined to offer him a contract.

Hayes & Yeading United
Hippolyte joined Conference South club Hayes & Yeading United on 31 December 2013. He made his only appearance for the club as a substitute in a 3–1 defeat to Concord Rangers on 11 January 2014. In a period hit by postponements due to the weather, Hippolyte departed the club in late January 2014.

Burnham
In late January 2014, Hippolyte signed for Southern League Premier Division strugglers Burnham and scored four goals in 14 appearances before the end of the 2013–14 season.

Livingston
On 10 July 2014, Hippolyte signed for Scottish Championship club Livingston on a one-year deal, after impressing manager John McGlynn while on trial. Hippolyte's debut for the club (the first professional appearance of his career) came in a Scottish Challenge Cup first round match versus Queen of the South on 26 July 2014. With the score at 2–2, he came on as a 70th-minute substitute for Gary Glen. In the extra time period, Hippolyte scored his first competitive goal for the club in an eventual 4–3 win and he went on to score four goals in his first eight games. Hippolyte started in the 4–0 2015 Scottish Challenge Cup Final victory over Alloa Athletic and won the first silverware of his career. He finished the 2014–15 season with 42 appearances and six goals, as Livi escaped relegation on the final day of the season. In late June 2015, he signed a new one-year contract.

Hippolyte began his 2015–16 season with what proved to be the winning goal in a 2–1 victory over Clyde in the first round of Livi's defence of the Scottish Challenge Cup. He began the season as a starter, before reverting to a substitute role in October 2015. He departed the Almondvale Stadium on 29 January 2016, after making 64 appearances and scoring 8 goals in 18 months with Livingston.

Falkirk
On 29 January 2016, Hippolyte joined Scottish Championship club Falkirk for an undisclosed fee. His first goal for the club came versus Rangers on 18 March, with the second goal of a 3–2 comeback victory. He made 15 appearances during the remainder of the 2015–16 season as Falkirk failed to win promotion to the Scottish Premiership via the Scottish Premiership playoffs.

Hippolyte scored eight goals in 35 appearances during the 2016–17 season, as once again the club failed to win promotion through the Scottish Premiership playoffs. He scored six goals in 16 appearances during the first half of the 2017–18 season, before being dropped in January 2018 and leaving the club at the end of the month. During his two years at the Falkirk Stadium, Hippolyte made 66 appearances and scored 15 goals.

St Mirren & Dunfermline Athletic
On 31 January 2018, Hippolyte joined Scottish Championship club St Mirren on an 18-month contract. He scored his only goal for the Buddies on his sixth appearance, with a penalty in a 2–1 defeat to former club Falkirk on 17 April 2018 and celebrated promotion to the Scottish Premiership at the end of the season. Hippolyte departed St Mirren Park in July 2018, after making just 8 appearances during the second half of the 2017–18 season.

On 13 July 2018, Hippolyte moved to Scottish Championship club Dunfermline Athletic on a two-year contract. He made 39 appearances and scored six goals during the 2018–19 season, with four of the goals coming in his first four appearances of the campaign. On 28 May 2019, it was announced that Hippolyte's contract had been terminated by mutual consent.

Yeovil Town
After a successful trial period, Hippolyte returned to England to sign a one-year contract with National League club Yeovil Town on a free transfer on 29 July 2019. He made 37 appearances and scored five goals during a 2019–20 season which culminated in defeat in the National League playoff quarter-finals. Hippolyte was retained for the 2020–21 season, but elected to transfer away from Huish Park in August 2020.

Scunthorpe United
On 29 August 2020, Hippolyte transferred to League Two club Scunthorpe United and signed a two-year contract for an undisclosed fee. During 18 months at Glanford Park, he made 55 appearances and scored five goals.

Stockport County
On 31 January 2022, Hippolyte joined National League club Stockport County on a free transfer and signed a contract running until the end of the 2021–22 season. He made 20 appearances and scored four goals during a season which culminated with the Hatters won the National League championship, which secured promotion to the English Football League. Hippolyte signed a new two-year contract in June 2022.

International career
Hippolyte is eligible to represent England, Saint Lucia or Grenada at international level. He was one of a handful of players the Grenada Football Association attempted to recruit ahead of 2018 FIFA World Cup qualifiers versus Puerto Rico in June 2015. In March 2023, Hippolyte was named in the Grenada squad for a 2022–23 CONCACAF Nations League A group match versus the United States.

Personal life
Hippolyte is of Grenadian descent on his mother's side and Saint Lucian on his father's. His father's cousin is former footballer and current manager Johnson Hippolyte and his second cousin is footballer Jonathan Hippolyte. He attended Twyford Church of England High School.

Career statistics

Honours
Livingston
Scottish Challenge Cup: 2014–15

St Mirren
Scottish Championship: 2017–18

Stockport County
National League: 2021–22

References

External links

Myles Hippolyte at stockportcounty.com

1994 births
Living people
English footballers
Association football forwards
Association football wingers
Brentford F.C. players
Southall F.C. players
Tamworth F.C. players
Hayes & Yeading United F.C. players
Burnham F.C. players
Livingston F.C. players
Falkirk F.C. players
St Mirren F.C. players
Dunfermline Athletic F.C. players
Yeovil Town F.C. players
Scunthorpe United F.C. players
Stockport County F.C. players
Southern Football League players
National League (English football) players
Scottish Professional Football League players
English Football League players
English sportspeople of Grenadian descent
English people of Saint Lucian descent